Burari Bura-bura Monogatari is a 1962 Japanese comedy film directed by Zenzo Matsuyama. It was Matsuyama's second film as a director.

Plot
Komako (Hideko Takamine) is a confidence trickster who pretends to be an atom-bomb victim with keloids who is collecting money for charity but actually just has a burn scar. Junpei is a confidence trickster who is beaten up after falsely claiming there is a fly in his udon. They meet in a police station. Komako tells Junpei to get a proper job, then steals his money, food and clothes.

Two children are abandoned by their aunt at Shimonoseki Station, and go with Junpei to Tokyo to find her, visiting many sites along the way, including the Kintai bridge, Himeji Castle and the Kurama Fire Festival. Junpei pretends to be a war victim, a blind man and a cripple to beg money but his begging often ends in failures. When Mariko gets a fever, no-one will treat her because of Junpei's appearance, until Komako helps. Eventually the children and Junpei get to Tokyo and find the aunt, but they decide to run away to find Junpei and Komako, who become a mother and father to the children.

Cast
 Keiju Kobayashi : Junpei
 Hideko Takamine : Komako Kuwata
 Reiko Dan : Aunt
 Norihei Miki : Jirokichi
 Ko Nishimura : Doctor
 Tatsuo Matsumura : Detective
 Bokuzen Hidari
 Kin Sugai
 Etsuko Ichihara
 Asao Sano

References

External links

1962 films
Japanese comedy films
1960s Japanese-language films
1960s Japanese films